Verdun is a squad-based multiplayer first-person shooter video game set during World War I. It was released on 28 April 2015 on Steam, after more than a year in Steam Early Access. It was released for PlayStation 4 on 30 August 2016. An Xbox One version was released on 8 March 2017. A standalone expansion Tannenberg was released into Steam Early Access on 16 November 2017, and left Early Access for a full release on 13 February 2019. The game released for PlayStation 5 and Xbox Series X/S on 15 June 2021 with higher resolution and better texture quality.

Verdun is inspired by the 1916 Battle of Verdun in France. The game includes historically accurate World War I weapons, authentic uniforms and equipment, detailed injury and gore modeling, and maps based on the real battlefields of the Western Front.

The game runs on the Unity engine and was developed by independent studios M2H and Blackmill Games.

Gameplay
Verdun is a realistic, tactical squad based game set in the trenches of World War I that can be played with up to 64 players (with 32 on each side).

Squads typically consist of 4 players, each with a unique role that is also typically made up of a squad leader called an NCO, and three roles dependent on the nation and type of squad selected. Squads can level up by helping the team, i. e. killing enemies, capturing sectors etc. gaining bonus abilities and upgrades on their preexisting abilities like accuracy, suppression etc. The NCO may rename the squad and change its type.

NCOs can call in support abilities like artillery barrages, creeping barrages, white phosphorus attacks, smoke screens and mortar shells. They can also call in more passive abilities to enhance the abilities of their squadmates, like ones helping them resist enemy suppression or enemy recon more effectively. NCOs can typically carry a self-loading pistol or revolver and melee weapons such as sabres and trench clubs. Other members of the squad typically use plenty of bolt-action rifles, plenty of bayonets and melee weapons, grenades, revolvers, semi-automatic rifles, machine guns, SMGs depending on the type of unit and the real-life availability of those kinds of weapons to them and such.

Suppression affects player aiming and vision, by violently tilting the camera view to simulate a soldier's bobbing and weaving out of fire or reactions to almost being shot. Bombs and artillery also suppress the player, making it harder for them to aim steady while being shot at. Players can kneel and prone and also climb on the parapets of trenches to see and shoot at incoming players. Environments usually have little cover and plenty of craters made by small artillery between two sectors.

There are 4 game modes: Frontlines, Attrition Warfare, Squad Defense and Rifle Deathmatch.

Game modes

Frontlines 
The players can choose to join one of the two historic sides of World War I, the Central Powers and the Triple Entente. Each side fights over a turn-based frontline map, that consists of multiple trenches called sectors that can be captured by either side. Staying true to the typical attrition warfare of that time, both sides attack and counter-attack each other in turn, so the player will be forced to defend each captured sector of trenches. The goal is to capture the enemy's HQ sector or win more points than the enemy team in order to win the game. Points are gained by capturing a sector, or by retaking a sector in a counter-attack. Players have to maintain momentum in an attack, by dying as little as possible and managing to get as many people in the enemy sector as possible for as long as it is manageable.

If an attack on a sector loses too much momentum, that is too many teammates die or do not reach the sector, the attack is called off and the enemy commences a counter-attack on their sector in return. As opposed to Tannenberg, there is not a certain number of tickets both teams have, but rather only momentum and timelimits to capture a sector.

Squad Defense 
Squad Defense is a cooperative game mode where players fight off endless waves of attacks by AI controlled soldiers in one of the 12, 4-man squads. This game mode can be played on the same maps available in the Frontlines game mode. This mode is the only one that can be played offline.

Rifle Deathmatch 
In Rifle Deathmatch, players fight in a free for all battle, armed only with one of the rifles and add-ons they can choose from when joining the game. This is a skill-based game-mode, where marksmanship and tactical cunning are rewarded. Players can earn experience and Career Points by killing other players, and with the Career Points can level up their rifles, gaining extra accessories for it, such as a bayonet or scope.

Development
Verdun started with early artwork in 2006, in 2007, development started in the OGRE engine. But in 2008, it switched to the Unity engine and had its first version. Later that year, it was improved to a second version. In February 2013, it entered proof of concept alpha. In April of that same year, it entered open alpha testing. Verdun entered open beta on 9 June 2013. It was Steam Greenlit on 28 June 2013 and entered Steam Early Access on 19 September 2013. After more than a year in Steam Early Access, it was released on 28 April 2015 on Steam. The developers have continued working on the game, releasing free expansions.

On 14 June 2016, the Verdun YouTube page uploaded a trailer announcing that the game would be available for PlayStation 4 and Xbox One set for a 30 August 2016, release. However, on 24 August 2016, the game's developer announced that the Xbox One version of Verdun would be delayed while the PlayStation 4's release date would be on schedule. It was released for PlayStation 4 on 30 August 2016, and on Xbox One on 8 March 2017.

In 2019 large updates were announced for the console versions of the game. The Xbox update was released first on 5 December 2019, with the PlayStation 4 update following on 20 December 2019. The free updates (called Verdun remastered) added content to the console versions of the game which had until then only been released on PC, including bot support, new squads, a new map, and various graphical updates and sound improvements.
 Another console update in December 2020 added cross-platform play between Xbox and PlayStation for Verdun and Tannenberg, as well as increasing the number of players in Verdun Frontlines matches from 32 to 40.

Reception

Verdun was met with "mixed or average" reception according to video game review aggregator Metacritic. and 6/10 on Gamespot, yet currently enjoys 87 % recommendations by players on Steam.

References

External links

Developer website for M2H
Developer website for Blackmill Games

2015 video games
Early access video games
First-person shooters
Linux games
MacOS games
PlayStation 4 games
PlayStation 4 Pro enhanced games
Video games developed in the Netherlands
Video games set in France
Windows games
World War I video games
Video games set in the 1910s
Video games with cross-platform play
Xbox One games
Tactical shooter video games